Tim McIntosh may refer to:
 Tim McIntosh (cricketer), New Zealand cricketer
 Tim McIntosh (baseball), American baseball player